(The Royal Orphanage) is a private primary school in Copenhagen in Denmark. The school has around 300 students and 25 teachers. The school has the right to print Den Danske Salmebog (The Danish Psalmbook).
The school was originally a combined orphanage and school, founded by Frederick IV of Denmark in 1727, and the institution was given a number of privileges, such as the right to manage a factory and a book printing shop. From 1740, it had the right to print Bibles and psalmbooks (the profit from which goes towards scholarships for some of the school's students), and during the 18th century, it was a center for Pietism in Denmark.

History 
In 1727 Frederick IV ordered the College of Missions to contribute materials for the opening of an orphanage in Copenhagen, and donated the buildings of the former chivalric academy in Nytorv (where the court is now located) to the project. The orphanage opened on the 11th of October, with a wide variety of privileges provided by the king, such as operating a factory and a pharmacy, as well as the printing and trading of books. During the Copenhagen Fire of 1728, the building was burnt, and a new building was built in its place.

In 1875, the school was moved to its current location in Nørre Farimagsgade.

References 

 Chr. Ottesen: Det kgl. Vajsenhus gennem 200 Aar. P. Haase og Søns Forlag, København 1927.

Social history of Denmark
History of Copenhagen
Orphanages
18th century in Copenhagen
Child-related organizations in Denmark
1727 establishments in Europe